The 1995 Rolex 24 at Daytona was a 24-hour endurance sports car race held on February 4–5, 1995 at the Daytona International Speedway road course. The race served as the opening round of the 1995 IMSA GT Championship.

Victory overall and in the LM WSC class went to the No. 10 Kremer Racing Kremer K8 driven by Giovanni Lavaggi, Jürgen Lässig, Marco Werner, and Christophe Bouchut. Victory in the WSC class went to the No. 2 Brix Racing Spice BDG-02 driven by Jeremy Dale, Jay Cochran, Fredrik Ekblom. Victory in the GTS-1 class went to the No. 70 Roush Racing Ford Mustang driven by Tommy Kendall, Paul Newman, Mike Brockman, and Mark Martin. The GTS-2 class was won by the No. 54 Stadler Motorsport Porsche 911 Carrera RSR driven by Enzo Calderari, Lilian Bryner, Renato Mastropietro, and Ulli Richter.

Race results
Class winners in bold.

References

24 Hours of Daytona
1995 in sports in Florida
1995 in American motorsport